The Sandyk Range is a range in the inner Tien Shan, Kyrgyzstan to the east of Jumgal Too. It is located in Jumgal and Kochkor districts of Naryn Region. The range descends from the west to the east transforming to adyrs (low foothills) in Kochkor Valley. The northern slope is short and steep, and dissected by small gorges. Tributaries of the Kochkor (river) and Jumgal rivers took its rise in the range.

References

Mountain ranges of Kyrgyzstan
Mountain ranges of the Tian Shan